Tahini or tahina is a Middle Eastern condiment made from toasted ground hulled sesame. It is served by itself (as a dip) or as a major ingredient in hummus, baba ghanoush, and halva.

Tahini is used in the cuisines of the Levant and Eastern Mediterranean, the South Caucasus, as well as parts of North Africa. Sesame paste (though not called tahini) is also used in some East Asian cuisines.

Etymology 

It is derived from the root  , which as a verb   means "to grind", and also produces the word  , "flour" in some dialects. The word tahini appeared in English by the late 1930s.

History 
The oldest mention of sesame is in a cuneiform document written 4000 years ago that describes the custom of serving the gods sesame wine. The historian Herodotus writes about the cultivation of sesame 3500 years ago in the region of the Tigris and Euphrates in Mesopotamia. It was mainly used as a source of oil.

Tahini is mentioned as an ingredient of hummus kasa, a recipe transcribed in an anonymous 13th-century Arabic cookbook, Kitab Wasf al-Atima al-Mutada.

Sesame paste is an ingredient in some Chinese and Japanese dishes; Sichuan cuisine uses it in some recipes for dandan noodles. Sesame paste is also used in Indian cuisine.

In North America, sesame tahini, along with other raw nut butters, was available by 1940 in health food stores.

Preparation and storage 
Tahini is made from sesame seeds that are soaked in water and then crushed to separate the bran from the kernels. The crushed seeds are soaked in salt water, causing the bran to sink. The floating kernels are skimmed off the surface, toasted, and ground to produce an oily paste. It can also be prepared with untoasted seeds and called "raw tahini", which is sometimes sold as an organic food product.

Because of tahini's high oil content, some manufacturers recommend refrigeration to prevent spoilage. Others do not recommend refrigeration, as it makes the product more viscous and more difficult to serve.

Culinary uses 

Tahini-based sauces are common in Middle Eastern restaurants as a side dish or as a garnish, usually including lemon juice, salt, and garlic, and thinned with water. Hummus is made of cooked, mashed chickpeas typically blended with tahini, lemon juice and salt. Tahini sauce is also a popular topping for meat and vegetables in Middle Eastern cuisine. A sweet spread, halawa taḥīniyya ( "sweet tahini"), is a type of halva sweet. It sometimes has mashed or sliced pistachio pieces sprinkled inside or on top. It is usually spread on bread and eaten as a quick snack.

In Armenia, tahini can be used as a sauce to put on lahmajoun.

In Greece, tahini is used as a spread on bread either alone or topped with honey or jam. Jars of tahini ready-mixed with honey or cocoa are available in the breakfast food aisles of Greek supermarkets.

In Cyprus, tahini, locally pronounced as tashi, is used as a dip for bread and sometimes in pitta souvlaki rather than tzatziki, which is customary in Greece; it is also used to make "tahinopitta" (tahini pie).

Tahini is called ardeh in Persian. In Iran it is used to make halvardeh, a kind of halva made of tahini, sugar, egg whites, and other ingredients. It is also eaten during breakfast, usually with an accompanying sweet substance, such as grape syrup, date syrup, honey, or jam. Ardeh and halvardeh are among the souvenirs of the Iranian cities of Yazd and Ardakan.

In Turkey, tahini is mixed with pekmez to make tahin-pekmez, which is often served as a breakfast item or after meals as a sweet dip for breads.

In Iraq, tahini is known as rashi, and is mixed with date syrup (rub) to make a sweet dessert usually eaten with bread.

In Israel, tahini ( t'hina) is a staple foodstuff. It is served as a dip with flat bread or pita, a topping for many foods such as falafel, sabich, Jerusalem mixed grill and shawarma, and as an ingredient in various spreads. It is also used as a sauce for meat and fish, and in sweet desserts like halva, halva ice cream and tahini cookies. It is also served baked in the oven with kufta made of lamb or beef with spices and herbs, or with a whole fish in the coastal areas and the Sea of Galilee.

In the Levant, tahini (Levantine Arabic: t'hine) is a staple food and is used in various spreads and culinary preparations. It is the main ingredient of the Tarator (sauce) which is used with falafel and shawarma. It is also used as a sauce for meat and fish. It is a ingredient in a seafood dish called siyadiyeh.

In the Gaza Strip, a rust-colored variety known as "red tahina" is served in addition to ordinary tahina. It is achieved by a different and lengthier process of roasting the sesame seeds, and has a more intense taste. Red tahina is used in sumagiyya (lamb with chard and sumac) and salads native to the falaheen from the surrounding villages, as well as southern Gaza. In the West Bank city of Nablus, tahina is mixed with qizha paste to make "black tahina", used in baking.

In Chinese cuisine, sesame paste ( zhimajiang) is used as a condiment in many dishes. Chinese sesame paste differs from the middle eastern tahini in that the sesame is roasted thus the paste is much darker, and has far less astringency. Often, white sesame paste is used in salty dishes, while black sesame paste is used in desserts (not to be confused with black sesame soup, which is made in a different manner from sesame paste, and should be considered two different items). Sesame paste is a primary condiment in the hot dry noodles of Hubei cuisine and ma jiang mian (sesame paste noodles) of Northeastern Chinese cuisine and Taiwanese cuisine. Sesame paste is also used as a bread or mantou spread, and may be paired with or baked into Bing (Chinese flatbread). Sesame paste is used as seasoning, condiment and dip in cold dishes (e.g. Liangfen) and hotpots.

For sweets 
Tahini is used in sweet desserts like cakes, cookies, halva and ice cream and halva with pistachios.

Nutrition 

In a 100-gram reference amount, tahini provides 592 calories from its composition as 53% fat, 22% carbohydrates, 17% protein, and 3% water (table). It is a rich source of thiamine (138% of the Daily Value, DV), phosphorus (113% DV), zinc (49% DV), niacin (38% DV), iron (34% DV), magnesium (27% DV), and folate (25% DV) (table). Tahini is a moderate source of calcium, other B vitamins, and potassium (table).

See also 
 List of Middle Eastern dishes
 
 List of dips
 List of sesame seed dishes
 List of spreads

References 

Sesame dishes
Nut and seed butters
Food ingredients
Food paste
Spreads (food)
Arab cuisine
Armenian cuisine
Cypriot cuisine
Greek cuisine
Iranian cuisine
Iraqi cuisine
Israeli cuisine
Jordanian cuisine
Lebanese cuisine
Levantine cuisine
Palestinian cuisine
Syrian cuisine
Turkish cuisine
White sauces
Middle Eastern cuisine